Klanten is a mountain in Vang Municipality in Innlandet county, Norway. The mountain is surrounded by several other notable mountains including Grindane to the north, Rankonosi to the west, Storebotteggi to the southwest, and Blåkampen to the southeast.

See also
List of mountains of Norway by height

References

Vang, Innlandet
Mountains of Innlandet